This is a list of transfers in Serbian football for the 2018–19 summer transfer window.
 Moves featuring Serbian SuperLiga and Serbian First League sides are listed.
 The order by which the clubs are listed is equal to the classifications at the end of the 2017–18 season.

Serbian SuperLiga

Red Star Belgrade

In:

Out:

Partizan

In:

Out:

Radnički Niš

In:

Out:

Spartak Subotica

In:

Out:

Voždovac

In:

Out:

Čukarički

In:

Out:

Napredak Kruševac

In:

Out:

Vojvodina

In:

Out:

Radnik Surdulica

In:

Out:

Mladost Lučani

In:

Out:

Zemun

In:

Out:

Mačva Šabac

In:

Out:

Rad

In:

Out:

Bačka BP

In:

Out:

Proleter Novi Sad

In:

Out:

Dinamo Vranje

In:

Out:

Serbian First League

Javor Ivanjica

In:

Out:

Borac Čačak

In:

Out:

Metalac G. M.

In:

Out:

TSC Bačka Topola

In:

Out:

Inđija

In:

Out:

Sinđelić Beograd

In:

Out:

Bežanija

In:

Out:

Teleoptik

In:

Out:

Novi Pazar

In:

Out:

Budućnost Dobanovci

In:

Out:

Radnički Kragujevac

In:

Out:

Sloboda Užice

In:

Out:

Trayal

In:

Out:

Žarkovo

In:

Out:

Bečej

In:

Out:

Zlatibor Čajetina

In:

Out:

See also
Serbian SuperLiga
2018–19 Serbian SuperLiga
Serbian First League
2018–19 Serbian First League

Notes

References

Serbian SuperLiga
2018
transfers